Ralph C. (Brigham) Young (August 22, 1898 – June 13, 1967) was an American politician in the state of Washington. He served in the Washington House of Representatives from 1943 to 1959.

References

1967 deaths
1898 births
People from Wilkinsburg, Pennsylvania
Democratic Party members of the Washington House of Representatives
20th-century American politicians
People from Cle Elum, Washington